Bovenkarspel-Grootebroek is a railway station for Grootebroek, Stede Broec and Bovenkarspel, Netherlands. The station opened on 6 June 1885 and is located between Hoorn and Enkhuizen. The station is on the Zaandam–Enkhuizen railway. The station and services are operated Nederlandse Spoorwegen. The current station building dates from 1965.

Train services
The following services currently call at Bovenkarspel-Grootebroek:
2 per hour intercity service Enkhuizen–Hoorn–Amsterdam–Hilversum–Amersfoort (–Deventer)
2 per hour intercity service Enkhuizen–Hoorn–Amsterdam (peak hours)

Bus services

External links
NS website 

Railway stations in North Holland
Railway stations opened in 1885